Vasantham TV (Tamil: வசந்தம்  தொலைக்காட்சி) (also known as Wasanthan TV) is a Tamil language television channel which broadcasts in Sri Lanka. The channel is operated by the Independent Television Network Limited (ITN Ltd), which is a state governed television and radio broadcaster in Sri Lanka. The channel commenced transmission on 25 June 2009. This television channel primarily broadcasts content in the Tamil language, catering to the media requirements of the Tamil-speaking community within Sri Lanka.

Frequency and coverage
Vasantham TV broadcasts to the Western Province of Sri Lanka on VHF channel 10. The channel extended its coverage to the North and East of Sri Lanka on 6 January 2010, transmitting via UHF channel 25 and Vasantham TV expand its coverage island wide soon.  Furthermore, viewers can stream the channel live, online via the ITN website.

See also
List of television networks in Sri Lanka
Media in Sri Lanka
Independent Television Network Limited

References

Independent Television Network
Tamil-language television stations in Sri Lanka
Television channels and stations established in 2009